Sukumol Kunplome (born 25 September 1975) is a Thai politician. She was the country's minister of culture 2011–2012.

Early life and education 
Sukumol was born on 25 September 1975. She completed primary school from Dara Samut School at Phuket province and then High School from Saint Paul Convent School at Sriracha, Chonburi, and graduated from high school from Wattana Wittaya Academy. She graduated Bachelor of Business Administration from Assumption University.

Personal life
Sukumol is married to Sontaya Kunplome, chief advisor of Phalang Chon Party. Her husband was barred from holding political offices for five years after the Supreme Tribunal dissolved Thai Rak Thai Party in May 2007.

References

Living people
1975 births
Sukumol Kunplome
Sukumol Kunplome
Sukumol Kunplome
Sukumol Kunplome
Sukumol Kunplome
Sukumol Kunplome
Sukumol Kunplome